Klempner (German for "tinker") is a surname. Notable people with the surname include:

Geoffrey Stephen Klempner, Canadian engineer
Mark Klempner (1956–2019), folklorist, oral historian and social commentator

German-language surnames
Occupational surnames